Sir John Wodehouse, 4th Baronet (23 March 1669 – 6 August 1754), was a British Tory Member of Parliament.

A member of an old Norfolk family, Wodehouse succeeded his grandfather Sir Philip Wodehouse, 3rd Baronet, in the baronetcy on 6 May 1681.  He was the son of Thomas Wodehouse and Anne Airmine, daughter and co-heiress of Sir William Airmine, 2nd Baronet.  In 1695 he was elected to the House of Commons for Thetford, a seat he held until 1698 and again from 1701 to 1702 and 1705 to 1708. He also represented Norfolk from 1710 to 1713. At some point he was the Recorder of Thetford. Wodehouse married Elizabeth Benson in 1700. After her early death he married Mary Fermor, daughter of William Fermor, 1st Baron Leominster. He died in August 1754, aged 85, and was succeeded in the baronetcy by his son from his second marriage, Armine - another son, William, had predeceased him. Wodehouse's descendants include Foreign Secretary John Wodehouse, 1st Earl of Kimberley, and the author P. G. Wodehouse.

Notes

References 
Kidd, Charles, Williamson, David (editors). Debrett's Peerage and Baronetage (1990 edition). New York: St Martin's Press, 1990, 

1669 births
1754 deaths
Baronets in the Baronetage of England
Members of the Parliament of England for Thetford
Members of the Parliament of Great Britain for Thetford
Members of the Parliament of Great Britain for Norfolk
John Wodehouse, 4th Baronet
English MPs 1695–1698
English MPs 1701–1702
People from Kimberley, Norfolk